Frederick Thomas Hervey Foster (1777-?), of Dunleer, County Louth, was a politician.

He was a Member of Parliament (MP) for Bury St Edmunds 1812 to 1818.

References

1777 births
Year of death missing
People from Dunleer
Members of the Parliament of the United Kingdom for English constituencies
UK MPs 1812–1818
Whig (British political party) MPs for English constituencies